Michael Speer is an American businessman from East Haven, Connecticut, and is a local community leader.

Personal life
Speer is a lifelong resident of East Haven, his family roots stem back over 85 years. His family has been located in the center of East Haven for their entire lives.

Speer is married and has one child.

Political life
Speer is a currently a member of the Democratic Party, although he was registered as a Republican when he ran for Town Clerk in 2013. Speer has been a member of the East Haven Democratic Town Committee since early 2014. He has stated that he has been focused on running for East Haven Mayor since he was 15 years old.

2013 East Haven Town Clerk Election

Speer was the endorsed Republican candidate for Town Clerk in 2013.  He lost to the Democratic candidate, Stacy Gravino Piccarillo, 3429 to 3534.

2015 East Haven Mayoral Election
Speer declared his candidacy for East Haven Mayor in May 2015, and received the unanimous endorsement for Mayor by the East Haven Democratic Party on Wednesday July 22, 2015. Speer faced Incumbent Joseph A. Maturo, Jr.

After months of advocating on behalf of 200 Tyler Street, East Haven CT and a promise from his nomination night speech to create a task force 'within the first thirty days of taking office." to deal with the 200 Tyler Street situation, Mr. Speer's plan was actually endorsed by his competitor Joseph A. Maturo, Jr. on Oct 9th, 2015.

The Connecticut Working Families party endorsed Democrat Michael Speer in the East Haven Mayor's race, citing the sexual harassment charges against Joseph A. Maturo, Jr. himself as well as the misconduct of the East Haven, Connecticut Police Department in 2012 towards Latinos. This endorsement does not give Speer access to the party's ballot however.

Connecticut State Representative's James Albis, representing the 99th District, and Roland Lemar representing the 96th District have endorsed Democrat Michael Speer in the East Haven Mayor's race.

Speer came in third in the 2015 election, with 1702 votes.  He was criticized for his reaction to the results that night

Awards

In the August 2015 issue of The New Haven Living Magazine, their 3rd annual Readers Poll was released announcing Speer as a winner in multiple categories. Speer tied New Haven Mayor Toni Harp for Community Leader, which in the previous two polls has been held by Congresswoman Rosa DeLauro. Speer also won in the category of Politician, 1st runner up to Congresswoman Rosa DeLauro who has held that top position in all three readers polls conducted by the New Haven Living Magazine readers.  Rounding out the top 3 and finishing, as 2nd runner up in the Politician category is 12-term Incumbent Shelton Mayor Mark Lauretti, who recently announced he would be seeking this 13th term

References

20th-century American businesspeople
People from East Haven, Connecticut
1986 births
Living people
21st-century American businesspeople
Businesspeople from Connecticut